Below the Surface may refer to:
Below the Surface (1938 film), an adventure tale set in the coal region of Newcastle, Australia
Below the Surface (1920 film), an American silent drama film directed by Irvin Willat and starring Hobart Bosworth
Below the Surface (TV series), a 2017 Danish nordic noir drama series, written and directed by Kasper Barfoed

See also
Under the Surface, 2006 album from Norwegian singer-songwriter Marit Larsen
Beneath the Surface (disambiguation)